"Tropical" refers to the tropics, regions of Earth surrounding the Equator.

Tropical may also refer to:

Music
 Tropical music, music genres deriving from Spanish-speaking areas of the Caribbean
 Tropical (EP), by Shit and Shine, 2014
 Tropical, an album by J. T. Meirelles, 1969
 Tropical, an album by Jorge Ben, 1977
 Tropical, an album by Pompeya, 2011
 "Tropical", a song by Inna from Nirvana, 2017
 "Tropical", a song by SL, 2018

Other uses
 Tropical (vehicles), a Greek motor vehicle manufacturer
 Tropical Air, a Tanzanian airline
 Tropical Airways, a defunct Haitian airline
 Tropical geometry, a mathematical area studying geometry over the tropical semiring

See also
 MS Tropicale, a cruise ship 1982–2021
 Tropic (disambiguation), including uses of Tropics